Act I: The Lake South, the River North is the debut studio album by the Dear Hunter. It was released on September 26, 2006, on Triple Crown Records. It was mixed by Claude Zdanow.

The album is the first part of a six-act story.  Act I is about the conception, birth, and childhood of the main character—known only as The Dear Hunter or "The Boy"—to a prostitute named Ms. Terri.

Track listing

Personnel
 Casey Crescenzo – vocals, guitar, bass, piano, organ, percussion, programming, production, engineering, mixing, mastering
 Nick Crescenzo – drums

Additional personnel
 Judy Crescenzo – additional vocals on "City Escape" and "The Inquiry of Ms. Terri"
 Phil Crescenzo – organ on "1878"
 Dan Nigro – additional vocals on "1878"
 Tom Neeson – trumpet
 Andrew Borstein – trombone
 Ryan Muir – trumpet, French horn

References

2006 albums
The Dear Hunter albums
Concept albums
Rock operas
Triple Crown Records albums